The Speaker of the Tripura Legislative Assembly is the presiding officer of the Legislative Assembly of Tripura, the main law-making body for the Indian state of Tripura. The Speaker is elected generally in the first meeting of the Tripura Legislative Assembly after the general elections for a term of 5 years from amongst the members of the assembly. The speaker is chosen from sitting members of the Tripura Legislative Assembly. The Speaker can be removed from office by a resolution passed in the assembly by an effective majority of its members. In the absence of Speaker, the meeting of Tripura Legislative Assembly is presided by the Deputy Speaker.

Eligiblity
 Being a citizen of India;
 Not be less than 25 years of age;
 Not holding any office of profit under the Government of Tripura; and
 Not being a Criminal Offender.

List of the Speakers of Tripura

See also
 Tripura Legislative Assembly
 Speaker of the Lok Sabha
 Speaker of the Lok Sabha
 List of current Indian legislative speakers and chairmen

References 

Lists of legislative speakers in India